The New Zealand Romney is a New Zealand breed of sheep. It derives from British Romney Marsh stock imported to New Zealand in the nineteenth century, and was established as a separate breed in 1904. It is the most numerous sheep breed in New Zealand.

History 

The New Zealand Romney derives from British Romney Marsh stock imported to New Zealand in the nineteenth century. It was established as a separate breed in 1904 with the formation of the New Zealand Romney Marsh Sheep Breeders' Association, and the first flock-book was published in the following year.

By 1915 it was the most numerous sheep breed in the country. In 2000 the Romney constituted almost 60% of the national herd, with some 26.3 million head.

It has contributed to the development of a number of modern breeds, among them the Coopworth, the Drysdale, the Elliotdale, the Perendale and the Tukidale in New Zealand, and the Romeldale in the United States.

Characteristics 

The hooves are black. The face is white with a pronounced topknot; there is some kemp on the face and legs. Ewes have good maternal qualities, but low prolificacy compared to some other breeds.

Use 

The New Zealand Romney is reared for both meat and wool. The wool is used for clothing, for blankets, for hosiery, and for carpets.

References 

Sheep breeds originating in New Zealand
Sheep breeds